Justice League Dark is a 2017 American adult animated science fantasy superhero film produced by Warner Bros. Animation and distributed by Warner Home Video. Featuring the DC Comics team of the same name created by Peter Milligan and Mikel Janín, the film is the 27th of the DC Universe Animated Original Movies and the eighth of the DC Animated Movie Universe. Unlike most installments in the DC Animated Universe Movies series, Justice League Dark features an original premise. The film stars Matt Ryan as John Constantine and Jason O'Mara as Batman, reprising their respective roles from previous media. It was released on Digital HD on January 24, 2017, and on DVD and Blu-ray on February 7.

A sequel, Justice League Dark: Apokolips War, was released in May 2020.

Plot
The movie start with when law-abiding people start to commit murders who believe their victims are demonic creatures.  The Justice League gather to conclude that magic is the source of the crimes, but Bruce Wayne / Batman is skeptical. Later that night at Wayne Manor, Bruce finds a written message on his walls telling him to find Constantine.

In a flashback 5 days ago, exorcist and con man John Constantine and Jason Blood engage the Demons Three in a poker game for high-end stakes; Constantine offers his home, the House of Mystery, as his part of the pool in exchange for a box of artifacts, including a chipped Dreamstone. When both parties are caught cheating, Constantine forced Blood summon Etrigan through a spell — a demon forced to share a body with Blood — to dispatch the demons. Afterward, Blood reprimands Constantine for making him summon Etrigan, and the two part ways.

Back in the present, Batman seek out a reluctant Zatanna "Z" Zatara to find Constantine. Zatanna is eventually convinced by Boston Brand / Deadman. Zatanna and Boston lead Bruce to the House of Mystery, where they meet Constantine, who is reluctantly working with a team. The group is also joined by Black Orchid, the spiritual embodiment of the House of Mystery and they decide to investigate the cause behind these supernatural occurrences. The team then visits Ritchie Simpson, an old friend of Constantine and Zatanna, where they find shroud spirits of Death waiting to collect Ritchie's soul upon his upcoming demise. Simpson has cancer and is resentful towards Constantine for abandoning him to his current predicament, but loans them the Keshanti Key thanks to Batman. Constantine and Zatanna use the key to view one of the victim's memories. However, a mysterious figure summon a creature to consume the victim to cover up the crime, Batman and Deadman attempt to delay the creature. Meanwhile, Constantine and Zatanna managed to find how the victim was possessed and narrowly escape before the victim is consumed, Constantine managed to retrieve the image of the ring the spirit was wearing.

They went back to Ritchie's house for Ritchie to decipher the ring, but the team finds him close to death with Blood on the scene. Constantine chases after Blood while Batman gives an adrenaline shot to revitalize Ritchie. They take Ritchie and Blood back to the House of Mystery where Black Orchid tend to Ritchie while the rest interrogate Blood. Blood explained that he was at Ritchie to find something to access the House of Mystery and found Ritchie dying at the scene, he wanted to break into the House to retrieve the Dreamstone. Blood explains that centuries ago the sorcerer Destiny possessed the Dreamstone in an attempt to overthrow Camelot-era Britain, using it to make people see their worst nightmares and feed off their torment. Blood was mortally injured in the battle, leaving Merlin to summoned Etrigan to defeat Destiny. After the battle, Merlin had the demon and bound him to Blood because Merlin knew they would be needed in the future. 

Ritchie briefly wakes to claim Felix Faust as his assailant. With the help of the plant elemental Alec Holland / Swamp Thing, the group locates Faust's Observatory of the Cosmos. After a battle with Faust, which he loses, the team conclude Faust had absolutely no involvement in hurting Ritchie or the nightmarish crimes. Ritchie awakens and is revealed to have the other piece of the Dreamstone, which has been keeping his cancer in remission; he apparently destroys Black Orchid. Constantine tries to reason with Ritchie, that the Dreamstone (with Destiny's soul trapped inside) is using him. However, the Dreamstone takes over Ritchie's body and transforms him into Destiny.

Destiny destroys the House and departs to start a frenzy; Zatanna saves the group, but passes out from the exertion. The Justice League tries to fight Destiny, but he causes them to perceive each other as demonic threats, so they attack each other. Etrigan attacks Destiny, but is separated back into Jason Blood and Etrigan. Constantine summons Swamp Thing, who attacks Destiny, while Batman and Zatanna disable the League. Destiny rips Alec Holland's corpse from Swamp Thing, weakening him and breaking his will; Swamp Thing withdraws. Constantine tricks Destiny into bringing him and Deadman within his protective shield, allowing Deadman to distract Destiny. Blood, fatally wounds Destiny with a sword, while Constantine and Batman destroy the Dreamstone (and Destiny's body), bringing back Ritchie who is dragged to Hell for his sins and as insurance that Destiny cannot come back. Blood succumbs to his original mortal wounds, and his body is buried near the place of his old village by Zatanna, Constantine and Etrigan. Zatanna agrees to join the League and offers Constantine a position as well. He declines, claiming that Batman would not approve, but Zatanna states it was Batman's idea. The two return to the now-rebuilt House of Mystery to discuss their application to the League, and Deadman joins the restored Black Orchid as his soulmate.

Voice cast

Production
The film is directed by Jay Oliva, and stars the voices of Matt Ryan, Jason O'Mara, Camilla Luddington, Nicholas Turturro, and Ray Chase. It is the first Justice League film and the second DC Universe animated film and the second film by Warner Bros. Animation to be rated R by the MPAA for some disturbing violence. Justice League Dark features an original premise wherein a supernatural force is causing violent crimes across America, and Justice League member Batman consults occult detective John Constantine to form a team of paranormal metahumans.

Reception

Dave Trumbore from Collider wrote: "Justice League Dark is a briskly paced, darkly magic adventure that gives some of DC's most shadowy heroes a chance to shine in a story that folds in mythology and mystery, while never losing sight of what it means to be a hero". Felix Vasquez Jr. of Cinema Craze also praised the film, calling it a "fun celebration of supernatural elements in DC comics".

It earned $3,267,099 from domestic home video sales.

Spin-off and sequel

Spin-off

The film spawned a spin-off animated web series titled Constantine: City of Demons that was released on The CW's online streaming platform CW Seed on March 24, 2018, with Ryan reprising his role. It was originally made to be a sequel to the live-action series Constantine and a part of the Arrowverse franchise, but writer J. M. DeMatteis stated that the direction of this series was changed and that it was set in the same universe as  Dark.

Sequel

A sequel titled Justice League Dark: Apokolips War was released on May 5, 2020, on digital download, followed by a May 19 release on Blu-ray. It concludes a five-film story arc, based on DC Comics "The Darkseid War" storyline by Geoff Johns, in the DCAMU that started from Justice League: The Flashpoint Paradox and its sequel Justice League: War then later revisited in The Death of Superman and Reign of the Supermen.

References

External links

DC page
 
Justice League Dark at worldsfinestonline.com

2017 animated films
2010s English-language films
2010s American animated films
2010s direct-to-video animated superhero films
2010s animated superhero films
2017 direct-to-video films
Animated Justice League films
DC Animated Movie Universe
Films about personifications of death
Films set in Washington, D.C.
Films about nightmares
Science fantasy web series
Films set in 2017
American direct-to-video films
Films directed by Jay Oliva
American adult animated films